Algernon Bertram Mitford, 1st Baron Redesdale,  (24 February 183717 August 1916) was a British diplomat, traveller, collector and writer, who wrote as A.B. Mitford. 

Mitford was a noted Japanologist and travelled extensively in East Asia and Japan during the Meiji-period. His most notable work is Tales of Old Japan (1871); other works include: The Bamboo Garden (1896), The Attaché at Peking (1900), The Garter Mission to Japan (1906) and Memories (1915). In 1886, he assumed by royal license the surname of Freeman-Mitford in accordance with his inheritance. He was the paternal grandfather of the Mitford sisters.

Early years
Mitford was the son of Henry Reveley Mitford (1804–1883) of Exbury House, Exbury, Hampshire, and the great-grandson of the historian William Mitford. He was educated at Eton and Christ Church, Oxford. While his paternal ancestors were landed gentry, whose holdings had once included Mitford Castle in Northumberland, his mother Georgiana Jemima Ashburnham was daughter of the 3rd Earl of Ashburnham and Lady Charlotte Percy, a scion of the Dukes of Northumberland through the Earl of Beverley. His parents separated in 1840 when Mitford was just three years old, and his mother remarried the Hon. Francis Molyneux.

Like his cousin Swinburne, he was named Algernon after his great-grandfather Algernon Percy, 1st Earl of Beverley; however, he mostly went by his middle name Bertram and was known familiarly as "Barty" or "Berty".

Career

Diplomacy
Entering the Foreign Office in 1858, Mitford was appointed Third Secretary of the British Embassy in St Petersburg. After service in the Diplomatic Corps in Shanghai, he went to Japan as second secretary to the British Legation at the time of the Meiji Restoration when Imperial rule was restored from the Tokugawa shogunate and the Japanese Seat of Power migrated from Kyoto to the Imperial seat at Edo (modern-day Tokyo). Mitford's memoirs recount the troubled time of the foreign settlements at Kobe over the fortnight following American Rear-Admiral Henry Bell's death, and the death of British consul Francis Gerard Myburgh. Mitford served as secretary under Myburgh's replacement, John Frederick Lowder. There he met Ernest Mason Satow and wrote Tales of Old Japan (1871), a book credited with making such Japanese classics as "The Forty-seven Ronin" first known to a wide Western public. With Satow, Mitford traveled extensively across the hinterland of Japan and became acquainted with Saigō Takamori, a famed samurai who led the Satsuma rebellion. He retired from the diplomatic service in 1873.

Following the 1902 Anglo-Japanese Alliance, in 1906 he accompanied Prince Arthur on a visit to Japan to present the Emperor Meiji with the Order of the Garter. He was asked by courtiers there about Japanese ceremonies that had disappeared since 1868.

Public life
From 1874 to 1886, Mitford acted as secretary to HM Office of Works, involved in the lengthy restoration of the Tower of London and in landscaping parts of Hyde Park such as "The Dell". From 1887, he was a member of the Royal Commission on Civil Services. He also sat as Member of Parliament for Stratford-on-Avon between 1892 and 1895.

According to W. S. Gilbert, Mitford served as a consultant on Japanese culture to Gilbert and Arthur Sullivan during the development of their 1885 Savoy Opera The Mikado. A traditional Japanese song hummed by Mitford to Gilbert and Sullivan during a rehearsal was used in the opera for the march accompanying the Mikado's entrance.

In 1886, Mitford inherited the substantial country estates of his first cousin twice removed, John Freeman-Mitford, 1st Earl of Redesdale. In accordance with the will he assumed by royal licence the additional surname of Freeman. Appointed a Deputy Lieutenant for Gloucestershire, he became a magistrate and took up farming and horse breeding. He was a member of the Royal Yacht Squadron from 1889 to 1914. Redesdale joined the Royal Photographic Society in 1907 and became a Fellow in 1908. He was President of the Royal Photographic Society between 1910 and 1912.

He substantially rebuilt Batsford House beside Batsford in Gloucestershire in the Victorian Gothic manorial style, but at such a cost that it had to be later sold. It was bought by Lord Dulverton and is still owned by his descendants.

Pre- and extra-marital fatherhood 
During his time in Japan, he was said to have fathered two children with a geisha. Later, he may have fathered Clementine Hozier (1885–1977), in the course of an affair with his wife's sister Blanche. Clementine married Winston Churchill in 1908.

Marriage and descendants 
In 1874, Mitford married Lady Clementina Gertrude Helen Ogilvy (1854–1932), the daughter of David Ogilvy, 10th Earl of Airlie, by his wife Blanche Stanley, the daughter of Edward Stanley, 2nd Baron Stanley of Alderley. They had five sons and four daughters. David Freeman-Mitford succeeded his father in the barony and was the father of the Mitford sisters.

Later life

Peerage 
In the 1902 Coronation Honours list it was announced that he would receive a barony, and the Redesdale title was revived when he was raised to the peerage as Baron Redesdale, of Redesdale in the County of Northumberland, on 15 July 1902. He took the oath and his seat in the House of Lords a week later, on 24 July.

Horticultural interests 

While in the Far East, he became interested in Chinese and Japanese garden and landscape design and the flora of these countries. On his return, he created the arboretum at Batsford as a wild garden of naturalistic planting based on his Chinese and Japanese observations.  His 1896 book, The Bamboo Garden, was the first book on the cultivation of bamboos in European temperate climates and remained the only text on the subject until the 1960s. He persuaded Edward VII to plant Japanese knotweed at Sandringham House and it later became difficult to eradicate, according to George VI.

H.S. Chamberlain 

In his closing years, Lord Redesdale edited and wrote extensive and effusive introductions for two of Houston Stewart Chamberlain's books, Foundations of the Nineteenth Century and Immanuel Kant: A Study and Comparison with Goethe, Leonardo da Vinci, Bruno, Plato, and Descartes, both two volumes each, translated into English by John Lees, M.A., D.Litt., and published by John Lane at the Bodley Head, London, in 1910 and 1914 respectively.

See also

 Hugh Cortazzi, Mitford's Japan : Memories and Recollections, 1866–1906, Format: Paperback, Published: January 2003, 
 Meiji Restoration
Anglo-Japanese relations
Mitford family
Baron Redesdale

Bibliography 

Tales of Old Japan (1871)
A tragedy in stone; and other papers (1882)
The Bamboo Garden (1896)
The Attaché at Peking (1900)
The Garter Mission to Japan (1906)
Memories (1915; 2 vols)
Further Memories (Hutchinson & Co., London, 1917 - posthumous)

Lord Redesdale also wrote an extensive Introduction  to Foundations of the Nineteenth Century, and translated, with another Introduction for Immanuel Kant, both by Houston Stewart Chamberlain.

Notes

References
Kidd, Charles, Williamson, David (editors). Debrett's Peerage and Baronetage (1990 edition). New York: St Martin's Press, 1990, 

Morton, Robert. A. B. Mitford and the Birth of Japan as a Modern State. Letters Home. Renaissance Books, 2017

External links 

 
 
 
 

1837 births
1916 deaths
People educated at Eton College
Algernon
British diplomats
British expatriates in Japan
Collectors of fairy tales
Deputy Lieutenants of Gloucestershire
Knights Commander of the Order of the Bath
Knights Grand Cross of the Royal Victorian Order
Members of the Parliament of the United Kingdom for English constituencies
UK MPs 1892–1895
UK MPs who were granted peerages
Algernon
Peers created by Edward VII